The Islamic Renaissance Movement (Ḥarakat An-Nahḑa Al-Islāmiyya; , MRI) is a moderate Islamist political party of Algeria.

History
The party was established in autumn 1990 when the Constantine-based association Jamiyat al-Nahda was transformed into a political party. Jamiyat al-Nahda had been established in 1988 by Abdallah Djaballah, and he decided to form the MRI after the Islamic Salvation Front rejected calls for an Islamic alliance. Its foundation was also a response to the FIS claim to hold a monopoly on Islamist politics.

In the 1991 parliamentary elections the party received 2.2% of the vote, failing to win a seat. The 1997 elections saw its vote share increase to 8.7%, resulting in it winning 34 of the 231 seats. However, it received just 0.6% of the vote in the 2002 elections, reducing it to a single seat. It recovered in the 2007 elections, receiving 3.4% of the vote and winning five of the 389 seats.

The party contested the 2012 elections as part of the Islamist Green Algeria Alliance. The alliance received 6.2% of the vote, winning 49 seats, down from the combined 60 won in 2007.

References

1990 establishments in Algeria
Conservative parties in Algeria
Islamic political parties in Algeria
Islamism in Algeria
Political parties established in 1990
Political parties in Algeria
Social conservative parties